Spooked is the fourteenth studio album by Robyn Hitchcock. It was recorded  in collaboration with Gillian Welch and David Rawlings at Woodlands Studio in Nashville, TN in 2004, and released later that year. The set comprises twelve new recordings, all Hitchcock compositions with the exception of "Tryin' to Get to Heaven Before They Close the Door", a cover of a Bob Dylan song.

The tracks revisit Hitchcock's 1980s style, containing in their lyrics portrayals of several eccentric characters, surreal situations and scenarios, and several references to death, one of Hitchcock's most enduring themes. The packaging too is retrospective, its green and yellow packaging falling in line with previous solo-acoustic albums such as Eye and Moss Elixir. The painting on the front is a detail from one of Hitchcock's own, featuring an enlarged cat-like creature looming from behind a wall.

Hitchcock dedicates the album to 'The Dark Princess', using the title of a track from 1999's Jewels for Sophia as a pseudonym for his partner Michele Noach.

Track listing

All songs by Robyn Hitchcock except where noted

"Television" – 6:22
"If You Know Time" – 3:32
"Everybody Needs Love" – 3:17
"English Girl" – 3:21
"Demons and Fiends" – 2:14
"Creeped Out" – 3:15
"Sometimes a Blonde" – 4:53
"We're Gonna Live in the Trees" – 3:24
"Tryin' to Get to Heaven Before They Close the Door" (Bob Dylan)  – 6:00
"Full Moon in My Soul" – 3:02
"Welcome to Earth" – 0:49
"Flanagan's Song" – 4:39

References

2004 albums
Robyn Hitchcock albums
Yep Roc Records albums